Bernard-Roland (1910–1987) was a French film director and producer. He is also known Bernard Roland.

Selected filmography
 Mademoiselle Swing (1942)
 The Midnight Sun (1943)
 The Ideal Couple (1946)
 We Are Not Married (1946)
 Portrait of an Assassin (1949)
 Cocagne (1961)

References

Bibliography
 Rège, Philippe. Encyclopedia of French Film Directors, Volume 1. Scarecrow Press, 2009.

External links

1910 births
1987 deaths
People from Moulins, Allier
French film directors
French film producers